The Hinterkaifeck murders occurred on the evening of 31 March 1922, when six inhabitants of a small Bavarian farmstead, located approximately  north of Munich, Germany, were murdered by an unknown assailant. The six victims were Andreas Gruber (aged 63) and Cäzilia Gruber (aged 72); their widowed daughter Viktoria Gabriel (aged 35); Viktoria's children, Cäzilia (aged 7) and Josef (aged 2); and the maid, Maria Baumgartner (aged 44). They were all found struck dead. The perpetrator (or perpetrators) lived with the six corpses of their victims for three days. The murders are considered one of the most gruesome and puzzling unsolved crimes in German history. 

Four of the dead bodies were stacked up in the barn, the victims having been lured into there one by one. Prior to the incident, the family and their previous maid reported hearing strange sounds coming from the attic, which led that maid to quit. The case remains unsolved to this day.

Location
The farm at Hinterkaifeck was built around 1863.

Less than a year after the murders, and the murder investigation, the farm was completely demolished revealing additional evidence including a mattock hidden in the attic and a pen-knife in the hay in the barn.

Murders

Prelude
Strange things began to occur in and around Hinterkaifeck sometime shortly before the attack. Six months prior to the attack, the family maid had quit. It has been widely claimed that her reason for leaving was that she had heard strange sounds in the attic and believed the house to be haunted. Andreas Gruber found a strange newspaper from Munich on the property in March 1922. He could not remember buying it and initially believed that the postman had lost the newspaper. This was not the case, however, as no one in the vicinity subscribed to the paper. Just days before the murders, Gruber told neighbours he discovered tracks in the fresh snow that led from the forest to a broken door lock in the farm's machine room.

Later during the night they heard footsteps in the attic, but Gruber found no one when he searched the building. Although he told several people about these alleged observations, he refused to accept help and the details went unreported to the police. According to a school friend of the seven-year-old Cäzilia Gabriel, the young girl reported that her mother Viktoria had fled the farm the night before the act after a violent quarrel and only hours later had been found in the forest.

31 March – 1 April 1922
On the afternoon of 31 March 1922, a Friday, the new maid, Maria Baumgartner, arrived at the farm. Maria's sister had escorted her there and left the farm after a short stay. She was most likely the last person to see the inhabitants alive. It appears that in the late evening, Viktoria Gabriel, her seven-year-old daughter Cäzilia, and her parents Andreas and Cäzilia, were lured to the family barn through the stable, where they were murdered, one at a time. The perpetrator (or perpetrators) used a mattock belonging to the family farm and killed the family with blows to the head. The perpetrator moved into the living quarters, where – with the same murder weapon – he killed Josef, sleeping in his bassinet, and Baumgartner, in her bedchamber.

Discovery
Four days passed between the murders and the discovery of the bodies. On 1 April, coffee sellers Hans Schirovsky and Eduard Schirovsky arrived in Hinterkaifeck to take an order. When no one responded to the knocks on the door and the window, they walked around the yard but found no one. They only noticed that the gate to the machine house was open before they decided to leave. Cäzilia Gabriel was absent without excuse for the next few days of school and the family failed to show up for Sunday worship.

Assembler Albert Hofner went to Hinterkaifeck on 4 April to repair an engine. He stated that he had not seen any of the family and had heard nothing but the sounds of the farm animals and the dog inside the barn. After waiting for an hour, he decided to start his repair, which he completed in roughly four and a half hours.

Around 3:30 p.m., Lorenz Schlittenbauer sent his son Johann (16) and stepson Josef (9) to Hinterkaifeck to see if they could make contact with the family. When they reported that they did not see anyone, Schlittenbauer headed to the farm the same day with Michael Pöll and Jakob Sigl. Entering the barn, they found the bodies of Andreas Gruber, his wife Cäzilia Gruber, his daughter Viktoria Gabriel, and his granddaughter Cäzilia, murdered in the barn. Shortly after, they found the chambermaid, Maria Baumgartner, and the youngest family member, Viktoria's son Josef, murdered in the home.

Investigation
Inspector Georg Reingruber and his  Department investigated the killings. Initial investigations were hampered by the number of people who had interacted with the crime scene, moved bodies and items around, and even cooked and eaten meals in the kitchen. The day after the discovery of the bodies, court physician Johann Baptist Aumüller performed the autopsies in the barn. It was established that a mattock was the most likely murder weapon, though the weapon itself was not at the scene. Evidence showed that the younger Cäzilia had been alive for several hours after the assault – she had torn her hair out in tufts while lying in the straw. The skulls of the victims were removed and sent to Munich for further examination.

The police first suspected the motive to be robbery, and they interrogated travelling craftsmen, vagrants, and several inhabitants from the surrounding villages. When a large amount of money was found in the house, they abandoned this theory. It was clear the perpetrator(s) had remained at the farm for several days: someone had fed the cattle, eaten the entire supply of bread from the kitchen, and had recently cut meat from the pantry.

With no clear motive to be gleaned from the crime scene, the police began to formulate a list of suspects. Despite repeated arrests, no murderer has ever been found and the files were closed in 1955. Nevertheless, the last interrogations took place in 1986, before Kriminalhauptkommissar Konrad Müller retired.

Inconsistencies
In the inspection record of the court commission, it was noted that the victims were probably drawn to the barn by restlessness in the stable resulting in noises from the animals. A later attempt, however, revealed that at least human screams from the barn could not be heard in the living area.

On the night after the crime, three days before the bodies were discovered, the artisan Michael Plöckl happened to pass by Hinterkaifeck. Plöckl observed that the oven had been heated by someone. That person had approached him with a lantern and blinded him, whereupon he hastily continued on his way. Plöckl also noticed that the smoke from the fireplace had a disgusting smell. This instance was not investigated and there were no investigations conducted to determine what had been burned that night in the oven.

On 1 April at 3:00 a.m., the farmer and butcher Simon Reißländer, on the way home near Brunnen, saw two unknown figures at the edge of the forest. When the strangers saw him, they turned around so that their faces could not be seen. Later, when he heard of the murders in Hinterkaifeck, he thought it possible that the strangers might be involved.

In the middle of May 1927, a stranger was said to have stopped a resident of Waidhofen at midnight. He asked him questions about the murder and then shouted that he was the murderer before he ran into the woods. The stranger was never identified.

Suspects

Karl Gabriel
The husband of Viktoria Gabriel, Karl Gabriel, had reportedly been killed in Arras, France, by a shell attack in December 1914, during the First World War. However, his body had never been recovered. After the murders, people began to speculate on whether he had indeed died in the war. Viktoria Gabriel had given birth to Josef in her husband's absence. Two-year-old Josef was rumoured to be the son of Viktoria and her father Andreas, who had an incestuous "relationship" that was documented in court and known in the village. He was raping his daughter and the town convicted them both of incest.

After the end of the Second World War, war captives from the Schrobenhausen region who were released prematurely from Soviet captivity claimed that they had been sent home by a German-speaking Soviet officer who claimed to be the murderer of Hinterkaifeck. Some of these men later revised their statements, however, which diminishes their credibility. Many theorized that this Soviet officer might be Karl Gabriel, because those who claimed to have seen the man after his reported death testified that Gabriel had wanted to go to Russia.

Lorenz Schlittenbauer
Shortly after the death of his first wife in 1918, Lorenz Schlittenbauer was believed to have had a relationship with Viktoria Gabriel and fathered Josef. Schlittenbauer came under suspicion by locals early in the investigation because of his several suspicious actions immediately after the discovery of the bodies. When Schlittenbauer and his friends arrived to investigate, they had to break a gate to enter the barn because all of the doors were locked. However, immediately after finding the four bodies in the barn, Schlittenbauer apparently unlocked the front door with a key and (suspiciously) entered the house alone. A key to the house had gone missing several days before the murders, though it is also possible that Schlittenbauer, as a neighbor or as Viktoria's potential lover, might have been given a key. When asked by his companions why he had gone into the house alone when it was unclear if the murderer might still be there, Schlittenbauer allegedly stated that he went to look for his son Josef. It is known that Schlittenbauer had disturbed the bodies at the scene, thus potentially compromising the investigation.

For many years after, local suspicion remained on Schlittenbauer because of his strange comments, which were seen as indicating knowledge of details that only the killer would recall. According to his information in the files for the case, local teacher Hans Yblagger discovered Schlittenbauer visiting the remains of the demolished Hinterkaifeck in 1925. Upon being asked why he was there, Schlittenbauer stated that the perpetrator's attempt to bury the family's remains in the barn had been hindered by the frozen ground. This was seen as evidence that Schlittenbauer had intimate knowledge of the conditions of the ground at the time of the murders, although being a neighbor and familiar with the local land, he may have been making an educated guess. Another speculation was that Schlittenbauer murdered the family after Viktoria demanded financial support for young Josef. Before his death in 1941, Schlittenbauer conducted and won several civil claims for slander against persons who described him as the "murderer of Hinterkaifeck".

Gump brothers
Adolf Gump was listed as a suspect as early as 9 April due to his connections to the Freikorps Oberland.

In 1951, prosecutor Andreas Popp investigated brothers Adolf and Anton Gump in relation to the murders at Hinterkaifeck. Their sister, Kreszentia Mayer, claimed on her deathbed that Adolf and Anton had committed the murders. As a result, Anton Gump was remanded to police custody, but Adolf had already died in 1944. After a short time, however, Anton was dismissed again, and in 1954, the case against him was finally discontinued because he could not be proven to have participated in the crime.

Karl S. and Andreas S.
In 1971, a woman named Therese T. wrote a letter citing an event in her youth: At the age of 12, she witnessed her mother receiving a visit from the mother of the brothers Karl and Andreas S. The woman claimed that her sons from Sattelberg were the two murderers of Hinterkaifeck. The mother said, "Andreas regretted that he lost his penknife" in the course of the conversation. In fact, when the farm was demolished in 1923, a pocket knife was found that could not be clearly assigned to anyone. However, the knife could have easily belonged to one of the murder victims. This track was followed without result. Kreszenz Rieger, the former maid of Hinterkaifeck, was certain she had already seen the penknife in the yard during her service.

Peter Weber
Peter Weber was named a suspect by Josef Betz. The two worked together in the winter of 1919-20 as labourers and they shared a room. According to Betz, Weber spoke of a remote farm, Hinterkaifeck. Weber knew that only one old couple lived there with their daughter and her two children. It is likely he knew about the incest between Gruber and his daughter. Betz testified in a hearing that Weber had suggested killing the old man to get the family's money. When Betz did not respond to the offer, Weber stopped talking about it.

Bichler brothers and Georg Siegl
The former maid, Kreszenz Rieger, worked from November 1920 to about September 1921 at Hinterkaifeck. She suspected the brothers Anton and Karl Bichler to have committed the murders. Anton Bichler had helped with the potato harvest at Hinterkaifeck and therefore knew the premises. Rieger said Bichler talked to her often about the Gruber and Gabriel family. Anton reportedly suggested that the family ought to be dead. The maid also emphasised in her interrogation that the farm dog, who barked at everyone, never barked at Anton. In addition, she reported speaking with a stranger through her window at night. The maid believed that it was Karl Bichler, the brother of Anton. She thought that Anton and Karl Bichler could have committed the murder together with Georg Siegl, who had worked at Hinterkaifeck and knew of the family fortune. Supposedly, Siegl had broken into the home in November 1920 and stolen a number of items, though he denied it.  He did state that he had carved the handle of the murder weapon when he was working at Hinterkaifeck and knew that the tool would have been kept in the barn passage.

Thaler brothers
The Thaler brothers were also suspected, according to a statement by the former maid, Kreszenz Rieger. The brothers had already committed several minor burglaries in the area before the crime. Rieger said that Josef Thaler stood at her window at night and asked her questions about the family, but she gave no answer. In conversation, Josef Thaler claimed to know which family member was sleeping in which room and stated that they had a lot of money. During their conversation, Rieger noted that there was another person nearby. According to her statement, Josef Thaler and the stranger had looked at the machine house and turned their eyes upwards.

Paul Mueller
Author Bill James, in his book, The Man from the Train, alleges that a man known as Paul Mueller may have been responsible for the murders. Mueller was the only suspect in the 1897 murder of a Massachusetts family, and James believes Mueller killed dozens of victims based on research in American newspaper archives. The Hinterkaifek murders bear some similarities to Mueller's suspected crimes in the United States, including the slaughter of an entire family in their isolated home, use of the blunt edge of a farm tool as a weapon (a pick axe), moving and stacking bodies of the victims, and the apparent absence of robbery as a motive. James suspects that Mueller, described as a German immigrant in contemporary media, might have departed the US for his homeland by 1912 after private investigators and journalists began to notice and publicize patterns in family murders across state lines.

Legacy

Many books and newspaper articles have been devoted to the murders. A series of articles by Josef Ludwig Hecker in the Schrobenhausener Zeitung revived interest in the murders.

A documentary film, Hinterkaifeck – Symbol des Unheimlichen (1981), is based on the Leuschner book; Hans Fegert adapted the book, directed the film (shot on Super 8, with sound), and was the cameraman. The film was shown regularly in Ingolstadt. Ten years later, Reinhard Keilich's play Hinterkaifeck – Deutschlands geheimnisvollster Mordfall (1991) was produced, and at the same time Kurt K. Hieber produced another documentary, shot on location, and shown on television and in local cinemas. Also in 1991, radio station Funkhaus Ingolstadt aired a documentary, Hinterkaifeck – auf den Spuren eines Mörders, and the Abendzeitung (München) ran a series of articles called Die sechs Toten vom Einödhof – Bayerns rätselhaftestes Verbrechen.

In 2007, 15 students of the Polizeifachhochschule (police academy) in Fürstenfeldbruck examined the case using modern criminal investigation techniques. In their final report (in German), they confirmed the meticulousness of the investigation at the time, but criticized the lack of professional forensics. In particular, the failure to take fingerprints was criticized, as this was already common practice at the time. Although it is almost certain that the murderer(s) can no longer be identified, all authors of the report independently agreed on who the main suspect in the case was. However, his name was not mentioned out of consideration for his descendants.

In 2017, the last chapter of The Man from the Train, by Bill James and his daughter Rachel McCarthy James, briefly discusses the murders at Hinterkaifeck. The authors explain the possibility that the German crimes might have been committed by Paul Mueller, the titular serial killer the authors believe killed several families in the United States under similar circumstances between 1898 and 1912. The murders attributed to Mueller, including the Villisca axe murders, were apparently random nighttime home invasions in or near small railroad towns that left entire families bludgeoned to death with the blunt end of an axe, and were probably motivated by a sadistic and necrophilic attraction to prepubescent girls. The authors rate the chances of Mueller as the Hinterkaifeck killer as "more or less a toss-up" but conclude "there's no real reason to believe that it's not him".

See also
 Axe murder
 List of unsolved murders

References

Bibliography
 Guido Golla (2016). Hinterkaifeck: Autopsie eines Sechsfachmordes. Norderstedt, .

External links
 Interviews, pictures, maps and theories (German)

1922 murders in Germany
20th-century mass murder in Germany
Axe murder
Family murders
Murders
Incest
March 1922 events
Mass murder in 1922
Murder in Bavaria
Stabbing attacks in Germany
Unsolved mass murders
Unsolved murders in Germany